Luciliocline is a genus of flowering plants in the pussy's-toes tribe with the daisy family.

 Species

References

Gnaphalieae
Asteraceae genera
Flora of South America